Calma may refer to one of the following

Calma, a former vendor of digitizers and minicomputer-based graphics systems
Calma (Afghanistan), place in Afghanistan
Čalma, a village in Serbia
Calma (beverage), a brand of instant decaf coffee-like beverage formerly sold in Europe
 Calma, a genus of sea slugs.
 Costa Calma, a resort town on the Canarian island of Fuerteventura, Spain
 "Calma" (song) by Pedro Capó